William Addams (April 11, 1777 – May 30, 1858) was an American politician who served as a Pennsylvania State Representative and United States Congressman, serving two terms in the U.S. House from 1825 to 1829.

Life and career
Addams was born in Lancaster County, Pennsylvania in 1777.

He moved to Berks County, Pennsylvania near Reading, and served as auditor there in 1813 and 1814.  He then served on the Berks County commission from 1814 through 1817.

In 1822, he was elected to the Pennsylvania House of Representatives, serving in that body through 1824.

Congress and later career
In 1825, he won election to the United States Congress as a Democrat, where he served through 1829.

Upon leaving the Congress, he served on the commission for the Deaf and Blind Institution for the states of New York and Ohio.  He also served as an associate judge of Berks County from 1839 through 1842, and as a captain in the Reading City Troop.  Outside of government, he worked pursuing farm interests.

Death
He died in Spring Township, Pennsylvania, in 1858, and is buried in St. John's Church Cemetery, in Sinking Spring, Pennsylvania.

References
 Who Was Who in America: Historical Volume, 1607–1896. Chicago: Marquis Who's Who, 1963.
 

1777 births
1858 deaths
Democratic Party members of the Pennsylvania House of Representatives
Pennsylvania state court judges
People from Berks County, Pennsylvania
Democratic Party members of the United States House of Representatives from Pennsylvania
People from Lancaster County, Pennsylvania
Jacksonian members of the United States House of Representatives from Pennsylvania
19th-century American politicians